Eseroline is a drug which acts as an opioid agonist. It is a metabolite of the acetylcholinesterase inhibitor physostigmine but unlike physostigmine, the acetylcholinesterase inhibition produced by eseroline is weak and easily reversible, and it produces fairly potent analgesic effects mediated through the μ-opioid receptor. This mixture of activities gives eseroline an unusual pharmacological profile, although its uses are limited by side effects such as respiratory depression and neurotoxicity.

References 

Semisynthetic opioids
Pyrroloindoles
Phenols
Mu-opioid receptor agonists